Michael Redenbach may refer to:

 Michael Redenbach (footballer, born 1949), Australian rules footballer for North Melbourne
 Michael Redenbach (footballer, born 1959), Australian rules footballer for Essendon